Eurosurveillance is an open-access medical journal covering epidemiology, surveillance, prevention, and control of communicable diseases with a focus on topics relevant for Europe. The journal is a non-profit publication and is published by the European Centre for Disease Prevention and Control.

History
The journal is jointly funded by the European Commission, the Réseau national de santé publique (later, Institut de Veille Sanitaire now ) in Paris, France, and the Public Health Laboratory Service (later, Health Protection Agency and Public Health England now UK Health Security Agency) in London, England, and a pilot issue was published in 1995. In 2005, collaboration started with the newly established European Centre for Disease Prevention and Control (ECDC) in Stockholm and a weekly epidemiological bulletin was published. Two years later, in 2007, the journal was transferred entirely to ECDC, which has published it since. Karl Ekdahl became the newly appointed editor-in-chief in 2008 and since 2011, Ines Steffens has been editor-in-chief of the journal.

Publishing model
Since its beginning, the journal is an open access online journal that does not charge article processing fees. The journal's website does not host any form of commercial advertisement.

Abstracting and indexing
The journal is abstracted and indexed in PubMed/MEDLINE, Scopus, Embase, and EBSCO databases.

Metrics and impact
According to the Journal Citation Reports, the journal has a 2021 impact factor of 21.286.

Scientific seminars
Since 2011, on the occasion of the 15th anniversary, the journal has been holding annual scientific seminars at the European Scientific Conference on Applied Infectious Disease Epidemiology. Invited speakers are public health experts and scientists; the seminars aim to stimulate a discussion about public-health-related scientific developments.

References

External links

Epidemiology journals
Publications established in 1995
Weekly journals
English-language journals